Boris Mikhailovich Artzybasheff (25 May 1899, Kharkiv, Russian Empire – 16 July 1965) was a Russian illustrator active in the United States, notable for his strongly worked and often surreal designs.

Life and career
Artzybasheff was born in Kharkiv, son of the author Mikhail Artsybashev. He is said to have fought as a White Russian. During 1919 he arrived in New York City, where he worked in an engraving shop.

His earliest work appeared in 1922 as illustrations for Verotchka's Tales and The Undertaker's Garland. A number of other book illustrations followed during the 1920s. Dhan Gopal Mukerji's Gay Neck, the Story of a Pigeon, with his illustrations, was awarded the Newbery Medal in 1928. His book Seven Simeons was a Caldecott Honor Book in 1938.  Over the course of his career, he illustrated some 50 books, several of which he wrote, most notably As I See.

During his lifetime, however, Artzybasheff was probably known best for his magazine art. He illustrated the major American magazines Life, Fortune, and Time.) He painted 219 Time covers from 1942 to 1966, including portraits of Louis Armstrong (21 February 1949) and Dave Brubeck (8 November 1954). Other illustrators of Time covers during this period, which has been called the golden age of Time covers, included Robert Vickrey, James Ormsbee Chapin, Bernard Safran and Boris Chaliapin.

During World War II, he also served an expert advisor to the U.S. Department of State, Psychological Warfare Branch.

After 1940, he devoted himself to commercial art, including advertisements for Xerox, Shell Oil, Pan Am, Casco Power Tools, Alcoa Steamship lines, Parke-Davis, Avco Manufacturing, Scotch Tape, Wickwire Spencer Steel Company, Vultee Aircraft, World Airways, and Parker Pens.

His graphic style is striking. In commercial work he explored grotesque experiments in anthropomorphism, where toiling machines displayed distinctly human attributes. Conversely, one of his works shows Buckminster Fuller's head in the form of Fuller's geodesic structure. In his personal work, he explored the depiction of vivid and extreme ranges of human psychology and emotion.

His papers are collected at Syracuse University.

Selected illustrations  
 Verotchka's Tales, by Dmitry Mamin-Sibiryak (E. P. Dutton, 1922),  — Illustrations at Wikimedia
 The Undertaker's Garland, by John Peale Bishop and Edmund Wilson (A. A. Knopf, 1922),  — Illustrations at Wikimedia
 Feats on the Fiord, by Harriet Martineau, 1802–1876 (Macmillan Children's Classics, 1924)  
 The Wonder Smith and His Son, by Ella Young (1927) 
 Gay Neck, the Story of a Pigeon, by Dhan Gopal Mukerji (1927)
 Orpheus: Myths of the World, by Padraic Colum (1930)
 Son of the Sword, by Youel B. Mirza (1934), 
 All Things Are Possible: An Apocryphal Novel, by Lewis Browne, dust jacket (1935)
 The Circus of Dr. Lao, by Charles G. Finney (1935)
 Seven Simeons: a Russian Tale, written by Artzybasheff (1937)
 Nansen, by Anne Gertrude Hall (1940)
 Land of Unreason, by Fletcher Pratt and L. Sprague de Camp (1942)
 The Tree of Life: Selections from the Literature of the World's Religions, by Ruth Smith (1942)
 The Little Sister, by Raymond Chandler, dust jacket (1949)
 The Simple Art of Murder, by Raymond Chandler, dust jacket (1950)

As the illustrator of Seven Simeons, which he also wrote, Artzybasheff was one of two runners-up for the Caldecott Medal in 1938, when the American Library Association inaugurated its award for children's picture books. Mukerji won the 1928 Newbery Medal for Gay Neck; Young and Hall were among the runners-up for that annual ALA award, which recognizes the "most distinguished contribution to children's literature". Finney won one of the inaugural, 1935 National Book Awards for The Circus of Dr. Lao.

Further reading

References

External links 
 
Boris Artzybasheff posters, hosted by the University of North Texas Libraries Digital Collections
Jim Vadeboncoeur's biography of Boris Artzybasheff
1951 Christmas Card
 
Guide to the Roman Weil Collection of Boris Artzybasheff 1929-1965 at the University of Chicago Special Collections Research Center

1899 births
1965 deaths
Artists from Kharkiv
People from Kharkovsky Uyezd
American speculative fiction artists
American illustrators
White Russian emigrants to the United States